Microphorella is a genus of flies in the family Dolichopodidae. It is currently considered both paraphyletic and polyphyletic, and several species groups may need to be recognised as subgenera or genera.

Species
Species groups as defined by Cumming & Brooks (2019):
 Microphorella short R1 species group:
 three undescribed species from western North America
 †Microphorella fragilis Cumming & Greenwalt in Greenwalt et al., 2022 – Middle Eocene, Kishenehn Formation
 Microphorella malaysiana species group:
 Microphorella bira Shamshev & Grootaert, 2004 – Sulawesi
 Microphorella malaysiana Shamshev & Grootaert, 2004 – Thailand, Singapore, Indonesia
 Microphorella papuana Shamshev & Grootaert, 2004 – Papua New Guinea
 Microphorella satunensis Shamshev & Grootaert, 2004 – Thailand
 Microphorella South Africa species group:
 one undescribed species from the Western Cape Province of South Africa
 Microphorella emiliae species group:
 Microphorella emiliae Shamshev, 2004 – Far East Russia (Sakhalin and Kuril Islands)
 Microphorella iota species group:
 Microphorella iota Colless, 1964 – Australia (Australian Capital Territory and New South Wales)
 Microphorella Australia species group:
 Microphorella bungle Brooks & Cumming, 2022 – Australia: New South Wales (Warrumbungle National Park)
 Microphorella viticula Brooks & Cumming, 2022 – Australia: New South Wales (Blue Mountains National Park)
 Microphorella Chile species group:
 one undescribed species from the Maule Region of Chile
 Microphorella chillcotti species group:
 Microphorella chillcotti Brooks & Cumming, 2012
 Microphorella vockerothi Brooks & Cumming, 2012
 Microphorella curtipes species group:
 Microphorella beckeri (Strobl, 1910) – Central Europe
 Microphorella curtipes (Becker, 1910) – north Italy, Corsica, Sardinia
 ?Microphorella ulrichi Gatt, 2003 – Tunisia, Morocco
 Microphorella chiragra species group:
 Microphorella chiragra Melander, 1927
 Microphorella longitarsis Melander, 1927
 Microphorella ornatipes Melander, 1927
 11 undescribed species from western North America
 Microphorella acroptera species group:
 Microphorella acroptera Melander, 1927
 Microphorella tubifera Melander, 1927
 nine undescribed species from western North America
 Genus Microphorella s.str.:
 Microphorella cassari Gatt, 2011 – Tunisia
 Microphorella ebejeri Gatt, 2012 – Israel
 Microphorella praecox (Loew, 1864) – Europe
 Microphorella similis Brooks in Brooks & Ulrich, 2012 – Switzerland
 Microphorella mamillata Gatt, 2012 – Tunisia

The Mediterranean species Microphorella merzi Gatt, 2003 is now classified in Eothalassius.

References

Dolichopodidae genera
Parathalassiinae
Taxa named by Theodor Becker